The Interim Morgan Government of Wales was formed on 9 February 2000 by Rhodri Morgan following the resignation of Alun Michael as First Secretary, which was pre-empted by a vote of no-confidence by Plaid Cymru.

Rhodri Morgan was named as Acting First Secretary on 9 February and confirmed as the permanent First Secretary on 15 February 2000. This Ministry ran until Morgan formed a coalition government with the Liberal Democrats in October 2000.

This government was always viewed as temporary and Labour had mooted looking for a coalition partner following their persevered poor showing in the 1999 election.

Cabinet 

* Indicates that the individual kept the same or similar job in the next government.
** Indicates that the individual was moved to a new job in the next government.
*** Indicates that the individual was either sacked or quit and held no ministerial role in the next government.

Deputy Secretaries 
Deputy Secretaries prior to the enactment of the Government of Wales Act 2006 were not officially part of the Government, were not paid and received limited official support.

* Indicates that the individual kept the same or similar job in the next government.
** Indicates that the individual was moved to a new job in the next government.
*** Indicates that the individual was either sacked or quit and held no ministerial role in the next government.

All job titles and dates are taken from the History of The National Assembly section of their website

Aftermath
Between February and October 2000 Rhodri Morgan's Labour Party had 28 of the Assembly's 60 seats. The six Liberal Democrat seats would provided a comfortable working majority.

Developments quickly occurred during the autumn of 2000 culminating in Tom Middlehurst resigning as Secretary for post-16 education on 9 October claiming he could not “contemplate sitting down at the Cabinet table with the Liberal Democrats”.

A new coalition government (officially referred to as the Coalition Partnership) was officially announced on 5 October 2000 with policy details emerging the day later. Cabinet Ministers were then appointed on 16 October and Deputies on 17 October. That government lasted until the 2003 election.

References

Welsh governments
Ministries of Elizabeth II